The Ibaizabal (wide river in Basque) is a river that drains southeastern Biscay to the Estuary of Bilbao. Both rivers run then together for a short length until they merge with the sea at Bilbao. It is disputed which river is the one that actually reaches Bilbao. It is commonly agreed that it is the Nervión, but there are some who argue that the Ibaizabal carries more water.

See also 
 List of rivers of Spain

Geography of Biscay
Rivers of the Basque Country (autonomous community)
Estuary of Bilbao
Rivers of Spain